San Juan Nepomuceno is the Spanish name for Saint John of Nepomuk

 San Juan Nepomuceno (1765), a 74-gun Spanish ship of the line that took part in the Battle of Trafalgar, under the command of Brigadier Don Cosme Damian Churruca
 San Juan Nepomuceno, Bolívar, a municipality in Bolívar department of Colombia
 San Juan Nepomuceno, Mexico, a mining area in San Joaquín Municipality, Querétaro
 San Juan Nepomuceno, Paraguay